Port Island is an artificial island in Seychelles, lying 2 km from the capital Victoria.

History
The island was constructed between 1995 and 2002. It belongs to the Mahe Port Islands, which are mostly artificial islands created by funds from Dubai when the Dubai dredger was placed in Seychelles.
The works began in 1998 
in 2009 the new Seychelles National Assembly building was inaugurated.
In 2012 the island was ready for installment of wind turbines.
In 2013 the island was visited by UN inspectors inspecting worldwide scale of wind farms.
In the end of 2013 the wind farm was launched
in 2014, it was reported that the PUC farm on Port Island was a success

Geography
The artificial island plan is a Mixed Commercial, Governmental, Financial, Port & Fisheries

Facilities 

The Port Island causeway connects Port Island to Perseverance Island and to mainland Mahe.

 Seychelles National Assembly
 Judiciary
 Stock Exchange Building
 University of Port Island
 Park
 Petrol Station
 SPTC Headquarters
 SIBA Headquarters
 Fish canning Factory
 Storage Facilities
 New Port section
 PUC farm
 Hotel - new govt. Hotel
 Heliport
 IKEA store

Demographics
The construction camp is located near the Seychelles National Assembly building on the north point.

Administration
The island belongs to English River District.

Image gallery

References

External links 

 info
 Mahe Map 2015

Islands of Mahé Islands
Artificial islands of Seychelles